The Nor'Wester Mountains are a group of mountains immediately south of Thunder Bay, Ontario, Canada, located on the southern limits of the City of Thunder Bay and south of the Kaministiquia River. Mount McKay is the highest, most northern and best known of these mountains. Other prominent peaks include Godfrey, Hurlburt, Johnson, Matchett, McRae, McQuaig, Rose, and Squaretop.

A few square kilometers of mountain slope south of Mount McKay are drained by Whiskeyjack Creek.

References

External links
 Nor'Westers Elevation Profile
 Nor'Westers Map Aerial View

Landforms of Thunder Bay
Sills (geology)
Igneous petrology of Ontario
Precambrian volcanism
Mountain ranges of Ontario